Belizean may refer to:
 Something of, or related to Belize, a Central American nation
 Belizean people, people originating in Belize whether they live there or in the Belizean diaspora
 Belizean population, see Demographics of Belize
 Belizean cuisine
 Belizean culture, see Culture of Belize
 Belizean society

See also 
 

Language and nationality disambiguation pages